Cache Creek Casino Resort is a casino/resort located in Brooks, California, in Northern California's Capay Valley.  Opened as a bingo hall in July 1985, it was renovated in 2002 and completed in 2004 as a destination resort.  The connected hotel contains 200 rooms, including 27 suites. Cache Creek offers 2,300 slot machines, more than 120 table games, a 14 table poker room, day spa, nine restaurants, and an 18-hole championship golf course.

History
On June 25, 1985, the Rumsey Band of the Wintun Indians (now known as the Yocha Dehe Wintun Nation) opened a modest bingo hall on their Rancheria in Brooks. The popularity of Cache Creek Indian Bingo & Casino soared immediately, and on October 7, 1993 the hall was expanded to include card games.

A second expansion began in 1996 and was opened in phases in 1998 and 1999. The bingo hall now had a 1,200 seat capacity and three new restaurants were opened, including China Camp and a 150-seat buffet. After California Governor Gray Davis signed the State Gaming Compact in 1999, the casino added slot machines and more table games.

In 2002, the tribe announced plans to build a $200 million property, renamed Cache Creek Casino Resort, on land adjacent to the existing facility.

Beginning in November 2006, Cache Creek Resort remodeled again, removing the Bingo Hall/Event Center and expanding the poker room and slot machine area. This remodel also included a sports bar and grill called the Sportspage.

In 2010 the Tribe announced their Event Center Project (ECP) which is designed to offer additional amenities at the Resort (including wireless access for all areas), provide additional administrative support space, as well as more parking. The proposed project would allow the Tribe to bring newer and larger entertainment acts, musical performances and other events to the Resort that could not previously be accommodated.   The newest outdoor stage was completed in 2011.

See also
List of casinos in California

Notes

External links 
 Official site
 Yocha Dehe Wintun Nation tribal site

Wintun
Casinos in California
Native American casinos
Buildings and structures in Yolo County, California
Tourist attractions in Yolo County, California